The 1540s BC was a decade lasting from January 1, 1549 BC to December 31, 1540 BC.

Events and trends
 History of ancient Israel and Judah—earliest date for Ahmose I founding the Eighteenth dynasty of Egypt.

Significant people
 1545 BC—Ahmose I, Pharaoh and founder of the 18th Dynasty of Egypt, dies, according to the High Chronology.